Louis Barthas (14 July 1879 – 4 May 1952) was a French infantry corporal who served on the Western Front of World War I for nearly the entire duration of conflict, stationed on the front lines for a  significant amount of time. He was a politically active socialist, an anti-militarist and a professional barrelmaker.

Barthas extensively documented his wartime experiences. After the war, he set out to compile these into a series of notebooks, forming a single comprehensive manuscript. He did not think to have them published, and the notebooks were kept in the back of a drawer for the next couple of decades.

His grandson, a teacher at a secondary school in Carcassonne, consigned the notebooks to a colleague history teacher who used them in his curriculum. Word of mouth brought renewed attention to Barthas' manuscript, and in 1978, sixty years after the war, it was published as Poilu: the World War I notebooks of Corporal Louis Barthas, barrelmaker, 1914–1918.

Early life 
Louis Barthas was born on 14 July 1879—Bastille Day—in the town of Homps, Aude. His father, Jean, was a barrelmaker and his mother, Louise, was a seamstress.

At the outbreak of the First World War, Barthas was a barrelmaker in Peyriac-Minervois, a job he returned to after the Armistice of 11 November 1918. As a socialist activist, he participated in the creation of the union of agricultural workers and shared the peaceful ideas of Jean Jaurès.

World War I 
Barthas was mobilized to the 280th Infantry Regiment of Narbonne in August 1914, with the rank of corporal – a rank he held for the duration of the conflict. In December 1915, he joined the 296th Infantry Regiment. In November 1917, he joined the 248th Infantry Regiment.

For four years he fought in the most dangerous sectors of the front: Notre-Dame-de-Lorette, Verdun, the Somme, and the Chemin des Dames. He took part in the French Army mutinies of 1917. His wartime memoir seems to have begun as a diary, which over the years came to fill many volumes.

Later life 

Barthas was decommissioned in February 1919, and soon set out to assemble a comprehensive narrative of his wartime years. He transcribed his diaries and letters into 19 notebooks, pasting in picture postcards, illustrations, and maps clipped from newspapers and magazines.

He did not think to have them published, therefore the notebooks remained unpublished in the family armoire for more than sixty years. Eventually discovered by professor Rémy Cazals of the University of Toulouse, they were published in 1978.

References

Footnotes

Bibliography

External links 

 
 

1879 births
1952 deaths
French male writers
French military personnel of World War I
French military writers
French memoirists
French socialists
People from Aude